This is a list of people who were heir apparent or heir presumptive to the Archduchy of Austria from when Charles III succeeded to the throne in 1711 to the end of the monarchy in Austria-Hungary in 1918. Those heirs who succeeded are shown in bold.

The position of heir to the Empire was often of great importance. More than once a younger brother of the emperor was persuaded to renounce his succession rights in his son's favour to provide a young male heir to the throne. The apparent suicide of the Crown Prince in 1889 and the assassination of the subsequent heir in 1914 (considered one of the great causes of World War I) led to instability in the monarchy, perhaps contributing to its abolition at the end of the War in 1918.

Heirs to the Austrian Archduchy

Heirs to the Austrian Empire

Austria
Austria

House of Habsburg-Lorraine
Austria-Hungary-related lists